Centropolis Township is a township in Franklin County, Kansas, USA.  As of the 2000 census, its population was 997.

Geography
According to the USGS, it contains two cemeteries: Kaub and Pleasant Hill.

The streams of Cole Creek, Minneola Creek and West Fork Eightmile Creek run through this township.

References
 USGS Geographic Names Information System (GNIS)

External links
 US-Counties.com
 City-Data.com

Townships in Franklin County, Kansas
Townships in Kansas